The 1956 Nebraska Cornhuskers football team was the representative of the University of Nebraska and member of the Big 7 Conference in the 1956 NCAA University Division football season. The team was coached by Pete Elliott and played their home games at Memorial Stadium in Lincoln, Nebraska.

Before the season
Nebraska's quest to return to its dominating winning ways was rather far off the track, the last three bright spots on the record books increasingly far into the past.  The last season resulting in a convincing win record was 1950, where Nebraska finished 6-2-1.  Prior to that, you had to look to the 8-2-0 finish in 1940.  Under this ongoing low period in program history, seven-year coach Bill Glassford had stepped down and was replaced by first-time head coach Pete Elliott, previously the Backfield Coach at Oklahoma, and a former college quarterback who helped lead the 1948 Michigan Wolverines football team to a national championship.  With four new assistants on the staff, Elliott set to the task of proving he could run a football team and succeed.

Schedule

Roster

Coaching staff

Game summaries

South Dakota

Coach Elliott's first game as a head coach went down as a victory as the Cornhuskers had little trouble with South Dakota in Lincoln.  It was the seventh straight loss by the Coyotes to Nebraska, and the 14th straight in the series without a South Dakota Victory since their one and only win against the Cornhuskers from 1899.

Ohio State

In front of one of the larger crowds to watch a Nebraska football game, the Cornhuskers stumbled out of the gate in Columbus and found themselves behind 0-27 by the end of the first half.  Nebraska avoided the shutout only by blocking a punt and falling on the ball in the end zone to secure a single touchdown.  It was only the second time these teams had met, and the Buckeyes held both victories.  Ohio State would go on to finish the season 6-3-0 and ranked #15 by the AP Poll.

Iowa State

Nebraska's Big 7 season opened with the Cyclones arriving in Lincoln and bringing with them a real battle.  As the game was drawing to a close, the Cornhuskers still trailed 6-7 when Nebraska PK George Harshman booted a 24-yard field goal in the final seconds to extract the win.  The victory extended Nebraska's winning streak over Iowa State to 11 in a row, as the record now stood at 41-8-1.

Kansas State

Kansas State arrived in Lincoln as the underdog, and perhaps few expected the Wildcats to put up much of a fight, as the stadium was relatively empty.  As expected, just five minutes into the game, Nebraska scored to set the tone of a game that seemed decided before it started.  However, if the outcome was foretold, someone failed to tell the Wildcat team, as Kansas State then put up a solid defensive effort to hold off any further Nebraska scores while punching in one of their own.  In a turn of fortunes from the previous week, it was a field goal that made the difference and this time handed Nebraska a defeat.  Kansas State had far to go to catch up in the series, however, as this win moved them only to 7-31-2 against Nebraska all time.

Indiana

Nebraska looked to be in form to bounce back from the upset loss to Kansas State the week prior, and made a statement suggesting as much when they jumped out to a 14–0 lead over the Hoosiers.  Following that second touchdown, however, the game was all Indiana as the undaunted visitors rolled off an unanswered 19 straight points to hand the Cornhuskers a third loss for the season, leaving them winless in their previous nine attempts against Indiana as they fell to 3-8-3 in the series.

Colorado

The Cornhuskers were handed their first shutout loss of 1956 by Colorado, whose two touchdowns and safety provided the points to break their two-game losing streak to Nebraska.  The win moved the Buffaloes to 6-9-0 over the Cornhuskers all-time, and left Nebraska nursing three straight losses, with just a 1–2 record in conference play so far for the season.

Missouri

Underdog Nebraska managed to create an exciting finish for the homecoming crowd at Memorial Stadium by staying within a score as time marched on.  With Missouri holding onto the lead 14-9 and less than two minutes remaining, the Cornhuskers threw for a touchdown to go up by one point and snatch the victory from the Tigers.  Nebraska's series lead remained comfortable at 28-18-3.  This victory was the 350th all-time win for the Nebraska football team.

Kansas

Turning their attention to the homecoming event in Lawrence, Nebraska once again faced an opponent they were not expected to defeat.  BY the end of the contest as the Jayhawks filed disappointed from the field on the wrong end of a 20–26 defeat, it may have seemed that coach Elliott had begun to figure out how to manage his football team, and that the season, now 4-4 and 3–2 in the Big 7, might be salvageable.  Nebraska's win was the fifth straight in the series, and they improved to 46-13-3 over Kansas overall.

Baylor

Nebraska fought a fairly even battle against the Bears until into the third quarter, when the line began to falter and allow Baylor to march down the field.  The momentum of the game finally turned completely when Baylor returned a punt 91 yards for a score, and the Bears eventually pulled away by 19 points.  It was the first time these teams had met since their first matchup in 1939, and the series was now tied at 1-1-0.  Baylor went on to finish the season 8-2-0 and ranked #11 by the AP Poll.

Oklahoma

The vaunted Oklahoma football powerhouse was Nebraska's final challenge of the year, and the Cornhuskers brought everything they had to bear against the Sooners.  Despite their best efforts, Nebraska was fortunate to escape Norman without having suffered a shutout loss thanks to a single touchdown on a five-yard pass.  Oklahoma moved to 17-16-3 against Nebraska to date, taking the lead in the series for the first time in the history of the games between these programs dating back to 1912.  Oklahoma went on to finish the season undefeated at 10-0-0, Big 7 champions, and AP national champions.

After the season

Coach Elliott's first season did not bring any significant change to the fortunes of the program, finishing with a losing season to extend by another year the stretch of relatively unsuccessful campaigns waged by the Cornhuskers since the dawn of the 1940s.  At the conclusion of the season, Elliott announced that he had accepted the head coaching position at California, making his first Nebraska season also his last.  His California tenure lasted only three years as he compiled a disappointing 10–21 record, and his last two head coaching jobs at Illinois and Miami produced only four winning seasons over nine years.

Nebraska's conference record under Elliott slipped to 146-58-12 (.704) while the overall program record fell to 351-189-34 (.641).  Backfield Coach Bill Jennings was subsequently named as Elliott's successor and assumed control over the struggling Cornhusker football program.

Future NFL and other professional league players
 Clarence Cook, 1957 18th-round pick of the Los Angeles Rams
Laverne Torczon, 1957 18th-round pick of the Cleveland Browns

References

Nebraska
Nebraska Cornhuskers football seasons
Nebraska Cornhuskers football